This is a list of all the United States Supreme Court cases from volume 555 of the United States Reports:

External links 

2008 in United States case law
2009 in United States case law